Nissen dōsoron  is a theory that reinforces the idea that the Japanese people and the Korean people share a common ancestry. It was first introduced during the Japanese annexation of Korea in the early 20th century by Japanese historians from Tokyo Imperial University after adopting preexisting theories conceived during the Meiji era. It cites both the Nihon Shoki and Kojiki to emphasize that the Japanese people descended from the Japanese deity, Amaterasu and the Korean people from Susanoo, her younger brother.

Overview 
The precursor to the theory was first conceived by three Japanese historians Shigeno Yasutsugu, Kume Kunitake, and Hoshino Hisashi with the publication of Kōhon kokushi gan (稿本国史眼) prior to the annexation. 

The book asserted that the legendary figures Susanoo, the brother of Emperor Jimmu, and Empress Jingū had ruled or invaded ancient Silla (Korea). Such views of Korea's historical subjugation to Japan became widely accepted in Japanese scholarship and integral to Japan's national history, as it was presented in other books of Japan's Meiji era (1868–1912), such as Ōtori Keisuke's Chōsen kibun (朝鮮紀聞) (1885), and Hayashi Taisuke (林泰輔)'s Chōsenshi (朝鮮史) (1892) which made similar arguments.

Japanese history revisionists used the story of Susanoo in particular, to link the deities of Japan to the deities of Korea in order to create a sense of justification over the annexation. One of which was to claim that the Korean god and the founder of the first Korean kingdom Gojoseon, Dangun was in fact the Japanese god, Susanoo.

This claim was based on the fact that Susanoo first emerged from the lands of Silla, a Korean kingdom during the Three Kingdoms period of Korea in a place called "Soshimori (曽尸茂梨)" but soon left the Korean peninsula to the Japanese archipelago as he was dissatisfied with the place according to both Nihon Shoki and Kojiki. Using this, Japanese historians claimed that Susanoo was the original Dangun who the Koreans descended from.

However, the claim was met with criticism from Korean historians as Dangun's alleged first founding of Gojoseon (2333 BC(?)–108 BC) was over two millennia prior to Susanoo's emergence from Silla (57 BCE–935 CE). To counter this, historians such as Shiratori Kurakichi, founder of the discipline of Oriental History (Tōyōshi 東洋史) in Tokyo Imperial University argued that the Korean deity was fabricated by Buddhist priests sometime after 372 CE. This allowed him to demonstrate "that Korea as a unified country developed relatively late in the history of Asia, and later than Japan", ultimately discrediting Dangun's supposed accomplishments in favor of the Japanese god. By the beginning of the rule, most Japanese historians denied Dangun's existence as a separate deity.

After discrediting Dangun as an autonomous and native god of the Korean people, Japanese officials such as Koiso Kuniaki (小磯國昭), a Governor General, began to teach the youth that "the Japanese could trace their lineage to Amaterasu, whereas the Koreans descended from Susanoo who had appeared on Mount Soshimori in Korea."

History

Pre-Meiji Period 
The outlines of the theory can be traced back to mid-Edo period Kokugaku scholarship. Hirata Atsutane was among those who used their studies of Kojiki and Nihon Shoki to claim that Korean and Japanese history was intertwined from the period of ancient nation formation and that a hierarchical relationship in which Japan was dominant could be established. The view is currently unsupported. Arai Hakuseki claimed that Japanese ancestors came from the Mahan confederacy, and that there was a possibility that Kumaso was Goguryeo.

Post-Meiji Period 
The Meiji period historians Hoshino Hisashi, Kita Sadakichi, and linguist Kanazawa Shosaburo have been criticized for promulgating theories of common ancestry used to justify Korea's annexation and policy of cultural assimilation.

Influence 

The theory gained further momentum among historians with much emphasis put on the natures of both the Japanese and the Koreans by comparing the two ethnic groups to Amaterasu and Susanoo as siblings with shared heritage but vastly different personalities.

While embodying the collective identity of the Japanese, Amaterasu was depicted as a god of serenity and patience while Susanoo was depicted as an unruly younger brother who depended on his benevolent elder sister's leadership. In addition, as early as the medieval period, Susanoo was regarded as a "foreign" deity who had come to the Japanese archipelago from the Asian mainland and was only re-evaluated by Japanese historians when the annexation of Korea commenced. Susanoo's impulsive behavior and his mediocrity was supposedly inherited by that of the Koreans (the descendants of Susanoo) and thus was treated as a task for the Japanese (the descendants of Amaterasu) to redeem the Koreans from political turmoil and cultural barbarism as their "elder sibling".

There was also an ancient view that Ōkuninushi was a foreign deity from the Korean peninsula, which was also later used as justification for nissen dōsoron, although there is no evidence for this beyond the Kojiki and Nihon Shoki listing him as a descendant of Susanoo.

The contrast between Susanoo’s lack of self-control and Amaterasu’s serenity was used as a model for the relationship of the two "sibling" nations: in colonial discourse, the alleged immaturity of the Korean people and their state was often contrasted with Japan’s successful modernization, which in turn legitimated Japanese colonial rule. Japanese physical anthropologist themselves played a significant role in the "expansion and management" of colonial Korea.

Reception 
Unsurprisingly, the majority of the Koreans were against the idea that the two ethnic groups derived from a common ancestry as much of the claims made by the nationalistic historians of Japan not only contradicted their own beliefs, but in turn also denied Koreans their own worshiped deity its autonomy. They insisted that "Koreans are without a doubt a unitary nation (tanil han minjok) in blood and culture." Following the 1938 introduction of a volunteer draft system for Koreans, during the Second Sino-Japanese War, the majority of Koreans who volunteered did so either out of coercion, such as threats to dispossess the business licenses of their alien parents, or out of hopes to escape political discrimination and obtain the right to vote and move freely by way of Japanese citizenship.

In contrast to its lukewarm reception in Korea, the theory of common ancestry enjoyed broad popular appeal in mainland Japan. The theory of common ancestry offered an enlarged version of the homogeneous nation theory that was applied to the entirety of the Great Japanese Empire.  Interestingly, in contrast to pan-Asianism, the theory "only included Korea in the Japanese ethnic community, not the other colonies" (such as Manchuria or Taiwan) as Korea was indeed a country that had been in close contact with Japan throughout most of its history and thus must have created a close sense of affinity amongst the Japanese. Nissen dōsoron was the "main pillar" supporting the related concept naisen ittai (内鮮一体), or unity of the inland (内) with Korea, which was represented with the character 鮮 (sen), derived from the name Chōsen. The character for inland was used in place of the more common abbreviated prefix for Japan, ni (日), because Korea was interpreted as already being a part of Japan.

Aftermath 

Due to overwhelming support of the theory, the Japanese Empire brought large influx of Koreans into the Japanese diaspora where their descendents remained in the islands as ethnic Koreans in Japan or Zainichi Koreans (在日韓国人・在日本朝鮮人). However, due to assimilation of the ethnic group and less people identifying themselves as Korean, the number of Zainichi Koreans have been slowly but steadily declining since the late 20th century, currently being the second largest ethnic minority group in Japan after Chinese immigrants.

With the rapid development of modern Japan and the growing threat of North Korea, so did its nationalism which made the reputation of the Zainichi Koreans become less favorable among the Japanese as many had favorable connections with North Korea. This forced the ethnic Koreans to become a target of hostility and animosity which in turn made Nissen dōsoron now a blasphemous theory and an obsolete piece of history for the Japanese.

Scientific re-evaluation 

While the Japanese and Korean people certainly are expected to share a considerable degree of genetic affinity by virtue of historical and geographic proximity, modern population genetics has provided a means to quantitatively measure the extent to which such an affinity is present.

The modern Japanese cluster is said to be the most similar with the Korean one; in a haplotype-based study, the Japanese cluster was found to share 87–94% of its genetic components with the Korean cluster, compared with a Han Chinese result of only 0–8%, a distinct contrast. Moreover, the genetic affinity to the Korean cluster was particularly strong among a cluster hailing from Shimane specifically and Honshu more broadly, but relatively less pronounced, albeit still overwhelming, in the Kyushu clusters. In any case, however, the study clarifies that "the estimate of ancestry profile cannot provide the definitive history of original migration, unless it will be further verified against historical evidence."

It is suggested that proto-Korean groups originating in the West-Liao River area in northeastern China migrated to the Korean peninsula and the Japanese archipelago, resulting in a close genetic similarity between the two ethnic groups.

See also 
Nichiryū dōsoron (in Japanese) : Theory that reinforces the idea that the Japanese people and the neighboring Ryukyuan people share a common ancestry.
Nichiyu dōsoron (in Japanese) : Theory that reinforces the idea that the Japanese people and the Jewish people share a common ancestry.

References 

History of Japan
History of Korea